Kuban is a geographic region in Southern Russia.

Kuban may also refer to:

Places

Russia
Kuban (river), a river in Russia
Kuban steppe, a geographic region
Kuban Oblast (1860–1917), an oblast of the Russian Empire
Kuban People's Republic (January 1918–November 1919), anti-Bolshevik state
Kuban Soviet Republic (April 13 – May 30, 1918), an administrative division of the Soviet Russian Republic
Kuban-Black Sea Soviet Republic (May 30 – July 6, 1918), an administrative division of the Soviet Russian Republic
Kuban-Black Sea Oblast (1920–1924), an oblast of the early Russian Soviet Federative Socialist Republic (RSFSR)

Other
Kuban, Iran, a village in Gilan Province, Iran

Sports
FC Kuban Krasnodar, an association football club based in Krasnodar, Russia
HC Kuban Krasnodar, a women's handball team based in Krasnodar
HC Kuban, an ice hockey team based in Krasnodar
RC Kuban, a rugby union team based in Krasnodar
Kuban Stadium, a multi-purpose stadium in Krasnodar

Other uses
SS Augusta Victoria (1888), a German passenger ship which served as the auxiliary cruiser Kuban in the Imperial Russian Navy from 1904 to 1907
Kuban (surname)
Kuban Airlines, based in Krasnodar, active from 1992 to 2012

See also
Cuban (disambiguation)
Kuba (disambiguation)